Syria national basketball team, nicknamed Nosour Qasioun (Qasioun Eagles),  represents Syria in international basketball competitions. The squad is governed by SBF, and is part of the FIBA Asia zone. Based on the number of overall medals won, Syria is a major force among basketball teams of WABA and ABC. The team has won eight medals at the WABA Championship and five at the Arab Basketball Championship.

Syria has qualified for the FIBA Asia Cup seven times and one time for EuroBasket throughout their history. Their best tournament result was the 4th place finish at the 2001 FIBA Asia Cup. However, Syria still seeks qualification for their first appearance to the FIBA World Cup and Olympics.

History
It was created in 1948 and is one of the oldest FIBA Asia teams on the continent, although in its first years of existence it only managed to participate in the Pan Arab Games. Syria participated in the EuroBasket 1949, winning only match out of six against Lebanon.

Its first appearance at the FIBA Asia Championship was at the 1999 edition in Fukuoka, Japan where they finished in eighth place.

The team had its best year in 2001, when it finished in the Final Four of the Asian Basketball Championship in Shanghai, China.

In November 2021, FIBA ​​lifted the ban on Syrian stadiums, which was issued due to the war in the country, and therefore for the first time in 10 years, an international match could take place. It took place on November 29, 2021 at the Al-Fayhaa Sports Arena in Damascus, where a men's basketball team played 2023 FIBA World Cup qualification match against Kazakhstan.

In early December 2021, the Syrian Basketball Federation confirmed Syria's return to the Arab Nations Championship in the UAE which will take place 9 to 16 February 2022. Syria had been absent from the event for ten years because of the Syrian war.

Competition record

FIBA Asia Cup

FIBA Asia Challenge

West Asian Basketball Championship

Asian Games

West Asian Games

Mediterranean Games

Arab Championship

Pan Arab Games

Islamic Solidarity Games

EuroBasket 1949
Syria once appeared at the European championships, namely at the Eurobasket 1949, held in Cairo, Egypt. The refusal of the Soviet Union to host the competition and FIBA Europe's unwillingness to ask Czechoslovakia to host consecutive tournaments meant that 1947 bronze medallist Egypt hosted the competition.  Due to travel difficulties and fears, few European teams would travel to the African country to compete.  Syria, as well as Lebanon, were asked to compete in the European championship despite being Asian countries.

In the seven team round robin tournament, the Syrians finished with a 1–5 record and finished in sixth place.
Team roster:
4 Shawki, 5 Khayat, 6 Nashawi, 7 Fo. Habash, 8 Abouhitian, 9 Qoudsi, 10 Sharaf, 11 Fe. Habash, 12 Shukri, 13 Nael, 14 Mashnouq, 15 Tinawi

Team

Current roster
Roster for the 2022 FIBA Asia Cup.

Past rosters

2021 FIBA Asia Cup qualification
Due to the COVID-19 pandemic, the FIBA Executive Committee decided that for the 2020 November window games will be held at a single venue under a bubble format.

Venue: Al-Gharafa Sports Club Multi-Purpose Hall, Doha

Opposition: Qatar  (28 November)
Opposition: Iran  (30 November)

2021 FIBA Asia Cup qualification

Opposition: Iran  (20 February)
Venue: Azadi Basketball Hall, Tehran
Opposition: Saudi Arabia  (23 February)
Venue: King Abdullah Sports City, Jeddah

Roster for the 2017 FIBA Asia Cup.

At the 2017 WABA Championship:

Depth chart

Head coach position
 Pat Elzie – 2003
 Mohamed Abo Sada – 2007
 Imad Othman – 2009
 Hady Darwish – 2010
 Mensur Bajramovic – 2011
 Goran Miljević – 2011
 Imad Othman – 2012–2014
 Hady Haj Darwish – 2014–2017
 Nenad Krdžić – 2017
 Veselin Matić – 2017–2019
 Joe Salerno – 2021–2022
 Javier Juárez Crespo – 2022–present

Kit

Manufacturer
2017–present: Adidas

General sponsor
2021–present: Cham Wings

See also
Syria national under-19 basketball team
Syria national under-17 basketball team
Syria women's national basketball team

References

External links
Official website 
FIBA profile
FIBA Europe EuroBasket 1949

Videos
Philippines vs Syria HL FIBA Champions Cup 2011 YouTube.com video

 
Men's national basketball teams
1948 establishments in Syria
National sports teams established in 1948